The J. W. Wood Building is a historic commercial building located at Lynchburg, Virginia.  The  commercial building in a modified Greek Revival-style.  It was built between 1851 and 1853 as a warehouse.  It is the largest and best preserved of the few pre-Civil War commercial structures remaining in Lynchburg.

It was listed on the National Register of Historic Places in 1983.

References

Commercial buildings on the National Register of Historic Places in Virginia
Commercial buildings completed in 1853
Greek Revival architecture in Virginia
Buildings and structures in Lynchburg, Virginia
National Register of Historic Places in Lynchburg, Virginia